The men's 110 metres hurdles event at the 2019 European Athletics U23 Championships was held in Gävle, Sweden, at Gavlehof Stadium Park on 11 and 12 July.

Medalists

Results

Heats
11 July
Qualification: First 4 in each heat (Q) and next 4 fastest (q) qualified for the semifinals.

Wind:Heat 1: -1.9 m/s, Heat 2: -1.9 m/s, Heat 3: -2.5 m/s, Heat 4: -1.7 m/s, Heat 5: -2.8 m/s

Semifinals
12 July
Qualification: First 2 in each heat (Q) and next 2 fastest (q) qualified for the final.

Wind:Heat 1: +1.1 m/s, Heat 2: 0.0 m/s, Heat 3: +0.7 m/s

Final
12 July

Wind: +1.4 m/s

References

110 metres hurdles
Sprint hurdles at the European Athletics U23 Championships